The yellow-spotted brush-furred rat (Lophuromys flavopunctatus) is a species of rodent in the family Muridae found in Angola, the Democratic Republic of the Congo, Ethiopia, Kenya, Malawi, Mozambique, South Sudan, Tanzania, and Zambia.
Its natural habitats are subtropical or tropical moist lowland forest, subtropical or tropical moist montane forest, and subtropical or tropical high-altitude grassland. The population in Ethiopia is isolated and can be found at high altitudes up to 4,500 m above sea level.

References

 Dieterlen, F. 2004.  Lophuromys flavopunctatus.   2006 IUCN Red List of Threatened Species.   Downloaded on 9 July 2007.

Lophuromys
Mammals described in 1888
Taxa named by Oldfield Thomas
Taxonomy articles created by Polbot